John Stephens may refer to:

Entertainment
John Legend (John Stephens, born 1978), American musician
John M. Stephens (1932–2015), American camera operator and cinematographer
John Stephens (TV producer), American television producer and screenwriter
John Stephens, musician and member of the band Neve

Politicians
John Stephens, MP for Bristol, 1391–1393
John Hall Stephens (1847–1924), U.S. Representative from Texas
John Stephens (English politician) (1622–1679), English MP for Bristol, 1660
John W. Stephens (1834–1870), state senator from North Carolina
John Stephens (Illinois politician), coroner of Cook County

Sports
John Stephens (American football) (1966–2009), American football player
John Stephens (Australian footballer) (born 1950), Australian rules footballer
John Stephens (baseball) (born 1979), Australian pitcher in Major League Baseball
John Stephens (rugby league), English rugby league footballer
John Stephens, Australian tennis player in 1964 Wimbledon Championships – Men's Singles

Others
John Lloyd Stephens (1805–1852), American explorer, writer, and diplomat
John Stephens (editor) (1806–1850), owner and editor of the South Australian Register
John William Watson Stephens (1865–1946), British parasitologist
John Sturge Stephens (1891–1954), Quaker, conscientious objector, humanitarian and history lecturer
Frank Stephens (advocate) (John Franklin Stephens, born 1981/82), American disability advocate, actor and athlete

See also
John Stephen (1934–2004), Scottish clothes designer
Jonathan Stephens (born 1960), British civil servant
Jack Stephens (disambiguation)
John Stephen (disambiguation)
John Stevens (disambiguation)
Stephen Johns (disambiguation)